Blue Money is a 1972 American soft core porn film written and directed by Alain Patrick as Alain-Patrick Chappuis and based upon a story by Nick Boretz. The film stars Alain Patrick, Barbara Caron, Inga Maria, and Jeff Gall. The film is distributed by Crown International Pictures.

Plot
Yearning to make real films in early 1970s Hollywood, California, 25-year-old French-Canadian Jim DeSalle gets caught up in the adult film industry, trying to support himself and his wife Lisa (Barbara Caron), with their Baby. They seem to have the perfect life, but it all falls apart.

Unbeknownst to Jim, they have been under surveillance by the local police Vice Squad for being involved in making and distributing pornographic films. Everything starts to unravel for Jim:  The police begin a series of raids, his "sleazy distributors" won't pay him, he has a fling with an actress, his wife takes their child and leaves him, and his creditors are seeking to seize his assets and evict him from his beach house.

It seemed like he had everything at the beginning of the film, it now looks as if he's going to be left with nothing.

It may be too late when Jim and Lisa finally realize that all they really want to do is to get on their boat, with Baby, and sail to the middle of the ocean, to get as far away from it all as they can. Just as Jim reveals to the Vice Cop.

(The uncredited role of the Vice Cop was done as a favor to director Alain Patrick by his friend Gary Kent).

Cast
 Alain Patrick as Jim
 Barbara Mills as Lisa
 Inga Maria as Ingrid
 Jeff Gall as Mike
 Oliver Auuey as The Fatman
 Steve Rourson as Freddie
 Maria Arnold, Susanne Fields, Eve Orlon, Sandy Dempsey, Susan Wescott, and Leslie Otis as Models
 Vanessa Chappuis as Baby
 John Parker as Benny
 Alex Elliot as Larry
 Bob Chinn as Narrator

Production
The story is told in a "mockumentary" style, with a voice-over narration from the Vice Squad police officer (Bob Chinn) describing black-and-white stills and video footage (in the fictional film stated as coming from the police investigation surveillance films).

Some of those involved in the project also worked on a number of other films, such as the two leads, Alain Patrick, who worked on over 26 other film and television projects, such as Time Tunnel, Harry O, and Ironside; and, Barbara Caron (Barbara Mills), who performed in The Stewardesses and Executives' Wives, among her 38 other film projects.

As many of those who worked on the film have also worked in the industry the film portrays, the movie itself is a quasi-documentary.

Release
Although it was released in May 1972, it was not rated until 1973 and not registered for copyright until its release on VHS in 1989. It has since been released on home media and VOD with different edits and run times. It is also in a number of DVD collections of similarly themed low-budget films distributed by Crown International Pictures, such as Sextette, The Sister-in-Law and The Virgin Queen of St. Francis High, by Mill Creek Entertainment and others, as well as being shown on television.

Soundtrack
Song, "Walk in the Sun", lyrics by Clarence Morley, music and song by Jay Torrey

Reception
An "insightful and well-made look behind the scenes of shooting low-budget erotica in the early 1970's", with people from the industry, such as producer Bob Chinn, cinematographer R. Michael Stringer, and performers Barbara Mills, Maria Arnold, Sandy Dempsey, Eve Orlon, and Suzanne Fields. In a "very well made film with a good story and some great performances" which "paints a fairly unhappy picture of the adult film industry", as a "small scale version of Boogie Nights", from some of those involved, at the time.

See also
 List of American films of 1972
 List of American films of 1970

References

External links
 
 
 Cars featured in Blue Money (1972), at IMCDB.org

1972 films
1970s pornographic films
American pornographic films
1970s English-language films
Films shot in California
Crown International Pictures films
Films set in Los Angeles
1970s American films